Cho Jin-ho (August 2, 1971 – October 10, 2017) was a South Korean football player who played as a midfielder or striker for the South Korea national team.

International goals
Results list South Korea's goal tally first.

References 

 나의 선수시절 21 : 조진호, 피치 위에 못다 핀 꽃

External links
 
 
 

1971 births
2017 deaths
Sportspeople from Daegu
Association football midfielders
South Korean footballers
South Korean football managers
South Korea under-20 international footballers
South Korea under-23 international footballers
South Korea international footballers
Pohang Steelers players
Gimcheon Sangmu FC players
Jeju United FC players
Seongnam FC players
Daejeon Hana Citizen FC managers
Gimcheon Sangmu FC managers
Busan IPark managers
K League 1 managers
K League 2 managers
K League 1 players
1994 FIFA World Cup players
Footballers at the 1992 Summer Olympics
Olympic footballers of South Korea
Kyung Hee University alumni
Footballers at the 1994 Asian Games
Asian Games competitors for South Korea